The library system of the University of California, Los Angeles, is one of the largest academic research libraries in North America, with a collection of over twelve million books and 100,000 serials. The UCLA Library System is spread over 12 libraries, 12 other archives, reading rooms, research centers and the Southern Regional Library Facility, which serves as a remote storage facility for southern UC campuses. It is among the ten largest academic research library systems in the United States, and its annual budget allocates $10 million for the procurement of digital and print material. It is a Federal Depository Library, California State Depository Library, and United Nations Depository Library.

History of the library system

1883–1944: Laying a foundation
The University Library at Los Angeles was founded in 1883, two years after the establishment of what was then known as the California State Normal School. The library's first acquisition was Survey of Wyoming and Idaho by Dr. Ferdinand Vandeveer Hayden In 1910, Elizabeth Fargo began her tenure as the university's first librarian and by 1919, the University Library was operated by a staff of four. By 1931, the Library had collected 24,000 volumes and was ranked 36th in the country by the Princeton Library Survey.

Upon Elizabeth Fargo's retirement in 1923, John E. Goodwin took the helm as librarian for a collection of 42,000 volumes, tended to by 12 staff members. Goodwin planned for the orderly expansion of the library by the immediate reclassification of books from the Dewey Decimal System to the Library of Congress Classification System. He also opposed and eventually defeated a proposal to make the library at Los Angeles an adjunct collection of a main research library at UC Berkeley.

Starting in 1929, Goodwin oversaw the construction and development of the Main Library, which was built after the university settled in its present location in Westwood. Goodwin also saw the bequest of the William Andrews Clark Memorial Library to UCLA in 1934. By the time Goodwin retired in 1944, the Library collection had grown to 462,000 volumes, supported by 52 staff members.

1944–1961: The Powell years
Appointed to replace Goodwin in 1944, Lawrence Clark Powell began a series of systematic changes and acquisitions meant to increase the prestige of the UCLA library system. During Powell's tenure, the Library saw a major expansion of its facilities as the central book stack was completed. During this period, a concerted effort was made to provide new or more comprehensive collections to support the academic research that was being conducted on campus. In 1959, Powell was named the founding Dean of the School of Library Service (now part of the UCLA Graduate School of Education and Information Studies), a position he would hold until 1966. Several facilities at UCLA would later be named after Powell, including the Undergraduate College Library. About his work for the UCLA libraries, Powell wrote

1961–1977: Accumulation and expansion
Robert Vosper was hired as University Librarian in 1961, and the following year, ground was broken for the first unit of the University Research Library, now the Charles E. Young Research Library. Completed in 1964, the construction of the Research Library entailed carting approximately 4 million index cards and 14 miles of books around campus. The newly completed six-story facility then became the administrative center for the UCLA Library system. The Main Library was then converted to the College Library. By 1964, the Library ranked 11th in the country, with more than two million volumes. Having been founded only sixty years prior, the UCLA Library was on pace to becoming one of the most important libraries in the country.

Vosper was succeeded by Page Ackerman in 1973, who served as librarian until her retirement in 1977. She was the first woman in the United States to head a library system of such a scale. Ackerman saw the development of the Library's administrative network, which became an innovative model for library management systems across the country. During her tenure, Ackerman oversaw an increased coordination of efforts with the libraries of all UC campuses, a necessity that came which was initially brought about by state budget problems. Under Ackerman, the UCLA Library acquired collections on many important figures, including Ralph J. Bunche, Gertrude Stein and Anaïs Nin.

1977–present

Since Ackerman's retirement in 1977, UCLA has seen a steady increase in collections, facilities and staff under librarians Russell Shank (1977–1990), Gloria Werner (1990–2002), Gary E. Strong (2003–2013), and Virginia Steel (2013–present). The library collection consists of more than 8 million volumes and more than 78,000 current serial titles and an aggressively expanding electronic resources collection. The UCLA Library is a member of the Association of Research Libraries, the Coalition of Networked Information, the Center for Research Libraries, the Council on Library and Information Resources, International Federation of Library Associations and Institutions, and the Scholarly Publishing and Academic Resources Coalition.

List of libraries and other campus collections
As of 2006,

 Arts Library
 Louise M. Darling Biomedical Library
 College (undergraduate) Library (Powell Library)
 Hugh & Hazel Darling Law Library
 Eugene and Maxine Rosenfeld Management Library
 Music Library
 Charles E. Young Research Library
 Library Special Collections
 Science and Engineering Library
 Southern Regional Library Facility
 Gonda Family University Elementary School Library
 William Andrews Clark Memorial Library 
 Rae Lee Siporin LGBT Library
 ASUCLA Library

 Richard C. Rudolph East Asian Library
 American Indian Studies Center Library
 Asian American Studies Center Reading Room
 Center for African American Studies Library
 Chicano Studies Research Center Library
 Grace M. Hunt Memorial English Reading Room
 Ethnomusicology Archive
 Film and Television Archive
 Institute for Social Science Research Data Archives Library
 Instructional Media Library
 UCLA Oral History Program
 UCLA Library Digital Collections
 UCLA Library Documenting Global Voices Initiative

Images of UCLA libraries

Notes

Further reading

External links
 
 Library locations at UCLA

1883 establishments in California
California, Los Angeles Library System
Library
California, Los Angeles
California State depository libraries
Libraries in Los Angeles
Westwood, Los Angeles